Ícolo e Bengo (English: Icolo and Bengo)
is a city council (município
or municipality) in the province of Luanda in Angola. It had a population of 81,144 in 2014.

History
As per decree 29/11, of 1 September 2011, which moved this municipality, along with the municipality of Quiçama from Bengo Province to Luanda Province. The others being  Luanda, Belas, Cazenga, Cacuaco, Viana and Quiçama. The transfer documents were signed on 2 April 2012 in Catete by the governors of Luanda Province, Bento Bento, and João Miranda, of Bengo Province, in the presence of the minister for territorial administration, Bornito de Sousa.

Geography

Overview

Icolo e Bengo is bordered to the north and south respectively by the municipalities of Dande and Quiçama (in Bengo and Luanda provinces respectively), to the east by the municipality of Cambambe (Cuanza Norte province), and to the west by the municipalities of Viana and Cacuaco (both in Luanda province).

Administrative Division
The municipality, with the seat in Catete, is divided into five comunas (communes), as follows:
 Catete
 Bom Jesus
 Cabiri
 Caculo Cahango
 Calomboloca

Personalities
Agostinho Neto (1922-1979), 1st President of Angola

References

External links

Municipalities in Luanda
Populated places in Luanda Province